The Thraex (pl. Thraeces), or Thracian, was a type of Roman gladiator, armed in the Thracian style with a small rectangular, square or circular shield called a parmula (about 60 x 65 cm) and a very short sword with a slightly curved blade called a sica (like a small version of the Dacian falx), intended to maim an opponent's unarmoured back.  His other armour included armoured greaves, a protective belt above a loincloth, and a helmet with a side plume, visor and high crest.
Ludia's female gladiators used the same weapons and armour.

He and the hoplomachus, with his Greek equipment, were usually pitted against the murmillo, armed like a legionary, mimicking the opposition between Roman soldiers and their various slaves. In essence, these slaves were not trained well and died a gruesome death.

See also
 Ludus Dacicus
 List of Roman gladiator types

References
Bronze figurine of a gladiator - British Museum
Terracotta figurine of 2 gladiators - British Museum
E. Köhne and C. Ewigleben (eds.). Gladiators and Caesars: The Power of Spectacles in Ancient Rome. London: The British Museum Press, 2000.

External links
 Fresco of a murmillo and Thracian fighting, found in Pompei in 2019

Gladiator types
Roman Thrace
Dacian weapons